François Chaumette (1923–1996) was a French actor.

Filmography

External links
François Chaumette at IMDB.

1923 births
1996 deaths
French male voice actors
Sociétaires of the Comédie-Française
French National Academy of Dramatic Arts alumni
20th-century French male actors